The 1991 United States House of Representatives special election in Texas's 3rd congressional district was held on May 18, 1991 to select the successor to Steve Bartlett (R) who was elected Mayor of Dallas. The primary was held on May 4, 1991, featuring mostly Republicans.

Runoff

References

United States House of Representatives 03
Texas 03
Texas 1991 03
United States House of Representatives 1991 03
1991 03
Texas 03